Supernova Heights is a house on Steele's Road in the Belsize Park district of the London Borough of Camden. The terraced property is most known for being the home of Oasis singer songwriter Noel Gallagher in the late 90s, and as a place of 'non-stop party'.  The house was named in allusion to Oasis's song "Champagne Supernova".

History

Gallagher bought the house on Steele's Road in early 1997, and owned it for two and a half years. Gallagher subsequently described it as a "big, fucking heavy house". The house became the constant site of paparazzi photographers during Gallagher's occupancy. Fans of Oasis would regularly hang out outside the residence and the house became notorious locally for raucous parties. Gallagher described the house at this time as like a "bad advert for drugs if you went inside it". Gallagher's wife at this time, Meg Matthews, remembered one of the members of the band The Charlatans falling down the house's limestone staircase and breaking his leg. The supermodel Kate Moss lived at the house for several weeks. Sean Rowley interviewed Gallagher at the house for his BBC Radio programme, "All Back to Mine", that was broadcast on Christmas Day in 1997. Gallagher had soundproofing put in the house which led his neighbour Bob Hoskins to describe him as the "quietest neighbour in Europe".

In a 2000 interview, Gallagher said that the house had "turned into a nightclub...The bar was always open, the door was always open, there were more people coming in and out than I ever got to know" and recalled "wasted years sitting there with the curtains closed" talking about conspiracy theories. An epiphany at the house in 1997 led to Gallagher's sobriety. Gallagher looked around the living room and realised that "20 to 30 people were there all the time. And none of them were my mates". Gallagher initially stopped drinking alcohol and taking recreational drugs for a week, which then became six weeks, and described himself as becoming "addicted to getting sober". He described the period between 1995 and 1997 as "mental and great. But unsustainable". "Supernova Heights was great for the time but then there came a point when I thought, 'I need to get out of this,'" Gallagher later told the Belfast Telegraph.  

It was sold by Gallagher to the actress and denizen of the Primrose Hill set Davinia Taylor in 1999 "on the strength of a drunken early morning conversation" as described by Kate Moss's biographer Laura Collins, and was later bought by the comedian and writer David Walliams in 2005 for £3.2 million. Walliams stated that he planned to take a year to renovate the house and joked that he wanted to call the house 'Superduper Heights'. Walliams restored the facade of the property and created "double-and-triple-storey spaces". He then put the house up for sale in 2018 for £5.35 million.

References

Belsize Park
Houses in the London Borough of Camden
Oasis (band)
1990s in London